Andrzej Skowroński (16 November 1953 – 10 December 2020) was a Polish rower. He competed in the men's quadruple sculls event at the 1980 Summer Olympics.

References

1953 births
2020 deaths
Polish male rowers
Olympic rowers of Poland
Rowers at the 1980 Summer Olympics
Sportspeople from Kraków